Toaster Nsabata (born 24 November 1993) is a Zambian professional footballer who plays as a goalkeeper for Sekhukhune United in the South African Premier Division and the Zambia national team.

Club career
Nsabata was born in Chingola.

Sighted training with Zanaco F.C. which was initially perceived as temporary, he afterward he made his departure from Nchanga Rangers F.C. in early 2016.

Nsabata suffered inconsequential injuries in an automobile accident on in July 2015.

In December 2020, he left Zanaco in December 2020 following the expiry of his contract. He signed for ZESCO United in January 2021 on a three-year contract.

In August 2021, he signed for Sekhukhune United of the South African Premier Division.

International career
In 2014, Nsabata made his senior debut, playing the complete 90 minutes in a 4-3 loss to Japan. 
He was dropped from the 2015 Africa Cup of Nations Zambia squad by coach Honour Janza.

References

External links
 
 

1993 births
Living people
Zambian footballers
People from Chingola
Zambia international footballers
Association football goalkeepers
Zanaco F.C. players
Nchanga Rangers F.C. players
ZESCO United F.C. players
Sekhukhune United F.C. players
South African Premier Division players
Zambian expatriate footballers
Zambian expatriate sportspeople in South Africa
Expatriate soccer players in South Africa
Zambia A' international footballers
2018 African Nations Championship players